Sue England (July 17, 1928 – March 19, 2018) was an American actress.

Early years
England won beauty titles as a youngster -- "Miss Tulsa" when she was 6 years old and "Oklahoma's Sweetheart" when she was older.

Career
England's professional acting career began in 1945, when she played Merle Oberon's daughter Susette Touzac in This Love of Ours. Her work in the film was described by a newspaper columnist as "one of the season's best fledgling performances".

Other notable films she appeared in include Kidnapped, The Devil on Wheels and City Across the River.

England later turned to television work and acted in shows such as Lost in Space, The Cisco Kid, Father Knows Best and as a Native American pregnant woman on Daniel Boone. Sue England made five appearances on Perry Mason and also appeared in an episode of the TV series The Lone Ranger, season 1, Eye for an Eye (episode 42).

Her acting career ended in 1974.

Selected filmography

References

External links
 

1928 births
2018 deaths
American film actresses
American television actresses
Actresses from Tulsa, Oklahoma
21st-century American women